Date honey, date syrup, date molasses, Debes, or rub (dvash tmarim or סילאן, silan) is a thick dark brown, very sweet fruit syrup extracted from dates.   It is widely used in Middle Eastern cuisine and Maghrebi cuisine.

Nutritional aspects
Date syrup is rich in the monosaccharides glucose and fructose. This means that most of its sugar content is absorbed into the bloodstream, and it raises the blood glucose levels more efficiently and immediately than other syrups. It is therefore highly suitable for people suffering from hypoglycaemia, for those with sucrose intolerance or those with pancreatic problems who have difficulty absorbing disaccharides. Date syrup is higher in magnesium and potassium than some natural sweeteners such as maple syrup and honey, and it has been a popular alternative to sugar in recent years. It is also rich in antioxidants due to its high phenolic and flavonoid content and has been shown to exhibit anti-inflammatory activity.

In national cuisines
It is used widely in Libya, usually with asida, a porridge-like dessert.

In Iranian and Iraqi cuisine, date syrup is used to sweeten tahini, consumed at breakfast. An alternative is grape syrup.

In Algeria, date syrup is used in desserts such as baghrir.

In the Middle East and Persian Gulf, date syrup is used for flavoring chicken and potatoes. They are rubbed in date syrup mixed with cardamom, salt, and olive oil, and then rolled in sesame before being fried in olive oil or baked it in the oven as a whole. Date honey is also used as a sauce for stuffed vegetables, such as onions and turnips, and as an ingredient in a semolina cake called basbousa, which gives the cake a honey-like taste.

Bangladesh produces around 20,000 tonnes of date molasses in each year.  The Kalkini Upazila region of Bangladesh is famous for its date juice and date molasses.

See also
 Pekmez
 List of syrups

References

External links

Arab cuisine
Arabic drinks
Algerian cuisine
Honey
Syrup
Libyan cuisine
Iraqi cuisine
Palestinian cuisine
Israeli cuisine
Date dishes